Young Drivers of Canada is a Canadian driving school franchise headquartered in Woodbridge, Ontario. In 2017, Young Drivers is the largest driving training organization in Canada, with 140 locations in six provinces across Canada. Over a million students have graduated from its driver education programs. The company's driving recommendations are often quoted in news stories about safe driving and the rules of the road.  Young Drivers of Canada has three core product offerings: The novice Young Driver education program, the Collisionfree!™ driver improvement course  and CogniFit Brain Training.

History

Young Drivers of Canada was established by Heinz Naumann in 1970. 

In 1975, Peter Christianson, a race car driver whose father died in a car accident at a young age, joined the organization and began to develop methods that have become the basis of driver's education courses offered today by Young Drivers of Canada. 

In 1979, Young Drivers of Canada held their first rally to promote safe driving. In the same year, Young Drivers instructors began using full low-beam headlights during their lessons, which also turns on rear lights, to increase visibility to other drivers and reduce the risk of collisions. 

In 1984, Christianson was appointed President of Young Drivers of Canada and in 1989, Naumann retired and sold his portion of Young Drivers. 

In 1987, The company expanded to the United States and in 1990, Young Drivers of Canada Finland, Young Drivers Your License to Survive was established. 

In 1995, Young Drivers of Canada introduced its Collisionfree!™ program, designed to aid experienced driver in developing proactive and reactive driving habits. Young Drivers of Canada was directly involved in developing the structure of Ontario's graduated licensing program in Ontario, Canada. 

In 1997, with input from Peter Christianson, Young Drivers of Canada was instrumental in designing the G2 driving license test requirements, the final test required by students to be licensed in Ontario. 

The U.S. division expanded until 1999 when the Ford Motor Company purchased Young Drivers of Canada. Ford focused development on the Canadian operations and the U.S. division was eventually closed. 

In 2003, Young Drivers of Canada introduced its CogniFit® program. The program trains students to use their cognitive abilities to handle issues with reaction time and divided attention. Later, the course was update to include a demonstration of the perils of texting and driving. 

The Ford Motor Company held equity in Young Drivers of Canada until 2005 when their interest was bought out by private investment. The company received national exposure when their students became involved in protests in front of local liquor stores, carrying the message that drinking and driving was not acceptable. 

In 2009, Young Drivers of Canada franchisees experienced a significant drop in revenue during the Ministry of Transportation Ontario, driving test strike, which continued for four months. During this time period, no road tests were taken, no exams were written and no licenses were issued. About this time, Young Drivers of Canada added a distance education program to the course curriculum. 

In 2013, the company began phasing out instruction with manual transmissions. 

In 2014, Young Drivers of Canada opened the first Advanced Driving Centre in Markham, Ontario. A mobile app for iOS and Android was introduced in 2016 which was launched to provide aspiring drivers with easy access to learner's practice tests for all provinces. 

Since 2017, Young Drivers of Canada operates 45 corporate driving centres in Canada with a staff of about 400, many of whom are driving instructors. The head office manages six corporate franchises with 45 classrooms and about 175 employees. There are 42 Young Drivers of Canada franchisees operating 102 classroom locations in Canada, with a total of roughly 225 employees. 

In 2020, Young Drivers incorporated virtual and online courses to their curriculum to facilitate learning during the COVID-19 pandemic.

On March 31, 2021, Peter Christianson retired as President and the position is now held by Adam Lombardi.

Young Drivers of Canada and the Community
In 2014, the company held its Distracted Driving Event featuring Google Glass. Members of the media were invited to execute a closed course that featured a variety of distractions, including Google Glass technology. The findings were featured in a news piece on Global News Toronto titled, "How Well Do You Drive When Distracted" 

A Winter Tire Driving Challenge was held on February 23, 2015 at the Young Drivers of Canada Advanced Driving Centre in Markham. Members of the media were invited to test a variety of tires including all-season, all-weather, ice and snow and snow tires to determine which tire would best suit winter driving conditions. The Toronto Stars Wheels feature writer, John Mahler, reported the results in his article, "Winter tire evaluation day a real eye-opener." 

In 2018, General Manager of Young Drivers of Canada stopped by Breakfast Television Toronto to talk about the top five driving mistakes everyone is making.

References

Companies based in Vaughan
Canadian companies established in 1970
Driver's education
1970 establishments in Ontario